Ricardo Moller (born January 28, 1980 in Montevideo, Uruguay) is a Uruguayan footballer currently playing for Progreso of the Segunda División in Uruguay.

Teams
  Bella Vista 2001
  Basañez 2002
  Sportivo Cerrito 2003-2005
  Peñarol 2005-2006
  Deportes Puerto Montt 2007
  Juventud Las Piedras 2008
  Rampla Juniors 2008
  Progreso 2009–Present

References
 Profile at BDFA 

1980 births
Living people
Uruguayan footballers
Uruguayan expatriate footballers
Juventud de Las Piedras players
Sportivo Cerrito players
C.A. Bella Vista players
Rampla Juniors players
Peñarol players
C.A. Progreso players
Puerto Montt footballers
Expatriate footballers in Chile
Association footballers not categorized by position